Crescentia (calabash tree, huingo, krabasi, or kalebas) is a genus of six species of flowering plants in the family Bignoniaceae, native to southern North America, the Caribbean, Central America northern South America.

Uses

The fruit pulp is used traditionally for respiratory problems. The hard shell can be used for containers, scoops, cups etc.

Selected species
Crescentia alata
Crescentia cujete
Crescentia portoricensis

References

External links

 http://phenomena.nationalgeographic.com/2014/02/10/planet-calabash/

 
Bignoniaceae genera
Flora of Central America
Flora of the Caribbean
Flora of South America
Flora of Southern Mexico
Tropical fruit
Neotropical realm flora
Taxa named by Carl Linnaeus